Qasr al-Hukm, also known as the Justice Palace, and until 19th century as Bin Dawas Palace, is a historic palace and a popular cultural heritage landmark in the ad-Dirah neighbourhood of Riyadh, Saudi Arabia, located directly opposite to Imam Turki bin Abdullah Grand Mosque in the Qasr al-Hukm District.

Once the administrative headquarters of the old city within the former walls, it was built by Deham bin Dawas in 1747 and is the oldest structure in Riyadh that was razed and rebuilt on numerous occasions over the course of time. It was also the official residences of several royals of the first and second Saudi states and today serves as the main office of the governor of Riyadh.

History

Establishment and the First Saudi State 
Qasr al-Hukm traces its origins to the reign of Deham bin Dawas al-Shalaan in 1747, the-then ruler of Riyadh oasis who built a fortified palace for himself. He abandoned the palace and fled Riyadh for Bani Khalid-ruled al-Hasa when Muhammad ibn Saud's forces advanced towards the city in 1773.

During Second Saudi State 
Following the defeat of the First Saudi State in the aftermath of the Ottoman–Wahhabi war in 1818, the palace was inhabited by Mishari bin Muhammad bin Muammar, who ruled as Riyadh's emir under the Ottoman-backed Egyptian tutelage until 1824, when Turki bin Abdullah al-Saud recaptured the city and rebuilt the palace after reinstating the Second Saudi State.

As Diriyah was dilapidated by the Egyptian forces in 1818, as a result, Qasr al-Hukm was eventually made the new center of power for the House of Saud by Turki bin Abdullah. In 1834, Turki was assassinated by his cousin Mishari bin Abdul Rahman as he was leaving the Great Mosque after Friday prayers. Mishari had subsequently proclaimed himself the new Imam of the Saudi state. Turki's son, Faisal bin Turki, upon being informed of his tragedy, rushed back towards Riyadh in order to avenge his father's assassination whilst abandoning his campaign against Bahrain.

Upon reaching Riyadh, he had found Mishari hiding inside the palace and laid siege to it. Faisal subsequently killed Mishari and succeeded him as the new Imam.

By the 1880s, the Haʼil-based Rashidi Emirate took-over Riyadh and deposed the House of Saud, bringing the Second Saudi State to a close in 1891 after the Battle of Mulayda and exiling its last leader, Abdul Rahman al-Saud and his family to Kuwait. The Rashidi leader, Muhammad bin Abdullah Al Rashid went on to destroy much of the palace in around 1889 in order to efface the legacy of the Saudis.

Third Saudi State and today 
In 1901, the deposed leader's son, Ibn Saud embarked on a raiding spree into Nejd in order to avenge his father's deposition. By January 1902, he retook Riyadh in a battle and pushed the Rashidis back to their ancestral homeland of Ha'il. 1909, Ibn Saud commissioned the reconstruction of Qasr al-Hukm, which was completed around 1912. It was his residence until 1937, when he moved to al-Murabba Palace. However, the palace continued to exercise administrative duties until the death of Abdulaziz in 1953.

The palace and its surrounding area gradually declined in importance when King Saud accelerated the expansion and modernization of Riyadh following his ascension to the throne in the 1950s, whereby he began constructing new neighborhoods in the city's north such as al-Malazz and al-Nasiriyah.

In 1976, the The High Commission for the Development of Arriyadh commissioned the Qasr Al-Hukm District Development Project. The designs were completed by 1979 and the construction lasted between 1983 and 1992 in broadly two phases, costing around US$500 million. The project was overseen by Prince Salman bin Abdulaziz al-Saud, the-then governor of Riyadh.

Phase 1 (1983–1988) 
The first phase lasted between 1983 and 1988, in which the main offices of the Riyadh's governor, mayor and the regular police were constructed in the palace.

Phase 2 (1988–1992) 
The second phase lasted between 1988 and 1992, where the Imam Turki bin Abdullah Mosque, Qasr Al-Hukm, Al-Adl Plaza, Assafah Plaza, Imam Muhammad bin Saud Plaza, Al-Musmak Plaza, Al-Thumairi Gate, and Dekhna Gate, Ad-Deerah Tower were restored and built.

In September 2015, the Saudi government opened the palace to the general public for the first time, with a free exhibition celebrating the unusual coincidence of the Saudi National Day and Eid al-Adha.

External links 
Official webpage - http://www.qasralhukm.com/

References

Buildings and structures in Riyadh
Tourist attractions in Riyadh
Palaces in Saudi Arabia